"Into the Blue" is a song by American electronica musician Moby, released on June 19, 1995 as the fourth single from his third studio album, Everything Is Wrong (1995). American musician Mimi Goese co-wrote the song with Moby and provided the vocals. The song is slow and melancholy, a stark contrast to the first four singles from the album.

The single peaked at number 34 on the UK Singles Chart. In one of the remixes, the "Spiritual Remix", Joy Division's song "Atmosphere" is prominently sampled and sequenced. Jon Spencer, frontman of American alternative rock band Jon Spencer Blues Explosion and a friend of Moby, contributed the blues-influenced "Into the Blues Mix" to the single, and in turn Moby remixed one of the band's own tracks.

Critical reception 
A reviewer from Music & Media commented, "First he's raving, then he's pop as pop could be. "Into the Blue" belongs to the latter category. It would almost be MOR material if the beats weren't that prominent." Brad Beatnik from Music Weeks RM Dance Update wrote, "What an oddity. The original album mix is a beautiful haunting cut featuring the soaring vocals of Mimi Goese – as brilliantly showcased on Later with Jools Holland recently. Here, Junior Vasquez turns the track into a mid-tempo garage-ish cut that sort of works. His Sound Factory Dub toughens things up nicely and there are also Beatmasters and Jon Spencer mixes." Barry Walters for Spin complimented the "etheral tones" of Goese on "Into the Blue", "with a ghostly grace that's truly startling after so much excitation."

 Track listing 
 12-inch single  "Into the Blue"  – 7:45
 "Into the Blue"  – 8:19
 "Into the Blue"  – 8:46
 "Into the Blue"  – 6:14

 CD single  "Into the Blue"  – 4:10
 "Shining" – 4:49
 "Into the Blue"  – 7:20
 "Into the Blue"  – 5:38

 CD single – remixes '
 "Into the Blue"  – 6:14
 "Into the Blue"  – 8:59
 "Into the Blue"  – 6:13
 "Into the Blue"  – 5:49
 "Into the Blue"  – 4:52
 "Into the Blue"  – 7:45

Charts

References

External links 
 

1995 singles
Moby songs
1995 songs
Songs written by Moby
Mute Records singles